John Holt (7 March 1931 – 24 June 2013) was an Australian veterinarian and sports shooter, who was the president of the World Small Animal Veterinary Association, co-founded its Australian chapter, and represented Australia at the 1960 Rome Olympics.

Biography
Holt was born on 7 March 1931 in Sydney. He graduated with a Bachelor of Veterinary Science from the University of Sydney in 1954 and then worked briefly as a cattle veterinarian and had a short career in the animal industry. In 1959 he purchased St George Animal Hospital, which specialised in treating pets at a time when many vets preferred working with larger animals; his business eventually expanded to six practices around Sydney and produced eight university professors. He cofounded the Small Animal Clinicians Group in 1967, which was later known as the Australian Small Animal Veterinary Association and was eventually merged into the Australian Veterinary Association, and financed and edited its journal, the Australian Veterinary Practitioner. He often travelled to North America to learn about veterinary practices relating to small animals there and was a guest lecturer at institutions including the University of Guelph in Canada and the Washington State University College of Veterinary Medicine. He was the president of the World Small Animal Veterinary Association from 1986 to 1988.  He strongly supported the campaign against live animal export.

In sports shooting, he competed in the 300 metre rifle, three positions event at the 1960 Summer Olympics. His brother Neville represented Australia in shooting at the 1948 London Olympics, and he and John participated together in the 2000 Summer Olympics torch relay.

He married Mary, a pharmacist, in 1960. They have both been noted patrons of the Australian Brandenburg Orchestra. He died aged 82 on 24 June 2013 in the Blue Mountains village of Mount Wilson; he was privately cremated.

Recognition
Holt received the World Small Animal Veterinary Association's Award for Service to the Profession in 1998, a Waltham Award for International Service from the American Academy of Veterinary Nutrition, and honorary memberships in several organisations such as the American Animal Hospital Association. In 1973 he received the Australian Small Animal Veterinary Association's inaugural Practitioner of the Year Award  and in 2007 the organisation gave him a special award for Meritorious Service and named its distinguished service award in his honour.

References

1931 births
2013 deaths
Australian male sport shooters
Australian veterinarians
Male veterinarians
Olympic shooters of Australia
Shooters at the 1960 Summer Olympics
Sportspeople from Sydney
University of Sydney alumni